The Taipei Liaison Office in the Republic of South Africa represents the interests of Taiwan in South Africa in the absence of formal diplomatic relations, functioning as a de facto embassy. Its counterpart in Taiwan is the Liaison Office of the Republic of South Africa in Taipei. It has two offices, one in Pretoria and the other in Cape Town. 

The Office is headed by a Representative, currently Matthew Chou. 

It has responsibility for the provinces of Gauteng, Limpopo Province, North-West Province, KwaZulu-Natal, Mpumalanga and Free State.

History 
The Office was formerly the Embassy of the Republic of China. However, when South Africa recognised the People's Republic of China, its diplomatic relations with Taiwan were terminated. This led to the establishment of the Office in 1998.  

The Office has responsibility for the interests of Taiwan in other African countries, such as Mauritius, Madagascar, Seychelles, Comoros, Kenya, Uganda, Malawi, Tanzania, Zambia, Somalia, Rwanda, Burundi, Eritrea, Angola, Zimbabwe, Botswana and Lesotho, as well as the French overseas region of Réunion. 

Taiwan previously had diplomatic relations with Malawi, and was represented in the country by the Embassy of the Republic of China in Lilongwe. Lesotho, which established relations with Taipei in 1966, switched recognition to Beijing in 1983.

Cape Town office
The Cape Town Office has responsibility for the provinces of Western Cape, Northern Cape and Eastern Cape as well as Namibia. 

There was also previously an office in Johannesburg, formerly the Consulate-General of the Republic of China. However, owing to financial considerations and the city's proximity to Pretoria, it was closed in 2009. 

A Liaison Office was also located in Durban, but has since closed. Prior to the ending of diplomatic relations, this had been a Consulate General.

Representatives
  (September 2017 - October 2020)
  (March 2021 -October 2022)
  (November 2022 -)

See also
 List of diplomatic missions of Taiwan
 List of diplomatic missions in South Africa
 South Africa–Taiwan relations

References

External links
 Taipei Liaison Office in the Republic of South Africa
 Closing of ROC Embassy, South Africa, 1997

 

South Africa
Taiwan
1998 establishments in South Africa
Diplomatic missions in Pretoria
Organizations established in 1998
South Africa–Taiwan relations